Fortugno is an Italian surname. Notable people with the surname include:

Francesco Fortugno (1951–2005), Italian politician
Nicholas Fortugno (born 1975), American video game designer
Tim Fortugno (born 1962), American baseball player and scout

Italian-language surnames